Emma Crum (born 28 January 1989) is a road cyclist from New Zealand. She participated at the 2010 UCI Road World Championships and 2012 UCI Road World Championships.

References

External links
 Profile at Procyclingstats.com

1989 births
New Zealand female cyclists
Living people
Place of birth missing (living people)